Leaving California
"Leaving California", song by Shawn Smith from Shield of Thorns
"Leaving California", song by Boys Like Girls from Crazy World
"Leaving California", song by Maroon 5 from V